Battle of Guanzhong may refer to:

Battle of Guanzhong (1861), battle between Qing and Taiping Heavenly Kingdom during the Taiping Rebellion
Battle of Guanzhong (1946–1947), battle between the nationalists and the communists during the Chinese Civil War